The Kyarra was a 6,953-ton (7,065 t) steel cargo and passenger luxury liner, built in Scotland in 1903 for the Australian United Steam Navigation Company.

Construction and launch
The Kyarra was built at Dumbarton by William Denny and Brothers, and launched on 2 February 1903 on the River Clyde, Scotland. Her name was taken from the aboriginal word for a small fillet of possum fur.

Career
For ten years Kyarra sailed between Fremantle, Western Australia, where she was registered, and Sydney, New South Wales carrying cargo and passengers. She sailed under the flag of the United Steam Navigation Company Limited of London.

On 6 November 1914 she was requisitioned in Brisbane and converted into a hospital ship (HMAT A.55 Kyarra) for the purpose of transporting the Australian medical units to Egypt. The hull was painted white with a large red cross on the side. She carried the full staff and equipment of the Nos. 1 and 2 General Hospitals, the Nos. 1 and 2 Stationary Hospitals, and the No. 1 Clearing Hospital.

In March 1915, Kyarra was converted into a troop transport. Commonwealth control ended 4 January 1918.

Wireless telegraphy
In October 1911, the then wireless operator, Sidney Jeffryes achieved brief fame for the ship which was reported in the Sydney Sun: "Record by the Kyarra. Mr. S. H. Jeffryes, wireless operator on the A.U.S.N. Co.'s Kyarra, which was fitted up by the Australasian Wireless Co., Ltd., has put up a record for overland wireless messages between ships. His report says:— "Coming into Adelaide on the 18th Instant, distant from Adelaide , I picked up the Cooma. The conditions were absolutely normal on the night, a fact which could hardly be said of the occasion four months ago, which was a night on which every operator got good distances, myself and the Levuka getting . Jeffryes was later appointed wireless operator for the Australian Antarctic Expedition.

Sinking
On 5 May 1918, Kyarra was sailing from Tilbury to Devonport to embark civilian passengers and take on full general cargo. However she was sunk by the German submarine  near Swanage with the loss of six lives on 26 May 1918.

The captain of UB-57, Oberleutnant Johannes Lohs, died at sea, aged 29. Lohs sailed from Zeebrugge on 3 August 1918. The last contact he made with base was on the evening of 14 August 1918. At the time UB-57 was homeward bound. She was believed to be in the area of the Sandiette Bank, east of the Straits of Dover. It is thought UB-57 hit a mine. Lohs' body subsequently washed ashore was buried in the Ysselsteyn German war cemetery, Netherlands.

SS Kyarra was discovered in the late 1960s by a member of the Kingston and Elmbridge British Sub-Aqua Club, which later bought the wreck.

In honour of this vessel, a house was named in Ipswich, Queensland, built in 1920.

References

External links

 UK Diving: WRECKS: Kyarra

1903 ships
Ships built on the River Clyde
Steamships
World War I shipwrecks in the Atlantic Ocean
Hospital ships of Australia
Maritime incidents in 1918
1918 in England
Wreck diving sites in England
Shipwrecks in the English Channel
Ships sunk by German submarines in World War I
1903 in Scotland